654 Zelinda is a minor planet orbiting the Sun that was discovered on 4 January 1908 by German astronomer August Kopff. On favorable oppositions, it can be as bright as magnitude 10.0, as on January 30, 2016.

In 1988, this object was detected with radar from the Arecibo Observatory at a distance of 0.89 AU. The measured radar cross-section was 2,200 km2. Measurements made using the adaptive optics system at the W. M. Keck Observatory give a diameter estimate of 131 km. This is 13% smaller than the diameter estimated from the IRAS observatory measurements. It is roughly triangular in shape.

References

External links
 Lightcurve plot of 654 Zelinda, Palmer Divide Observatory, B. D. Warner (2007)
 Asteroid Lightcurve Database (LCDB), query form (info )
 Dictionary of Minor Planet Names, Google books
 Asteroids and comets rotation curves, CdR – Observatoire de Genève, Raoul Behrend
 Discovery Circumstances: Numbered Minor Planets (1)-(5000) – Minor Planet Center
 
 

Background asteroids
Zelinda
Zelinda
C-type asteroids (Tholen)
Ch-type asteroids (SMASS)
19080104